The Embassy of Turkey in Rome is Turkey's diplomatic mission to Italy. It is located at Via Palestro, 28, Rome. 

The current ambassador is Murat Esenli.

See also
List of Ambassadors from Turkey
Foreign relations of Turkey
Italy–Turkey relations
Malta–Turkey relations
Turks in Italy

External links 
 Turkish Embassy in Rome

Rome
Turkey
Italy–Turkey relations